Issoufou is a surname and given name. Notable people with the surname include:

Given name 
Issoufou Assoumane, Nigerien politician and ministers of council
Issoufou Boubacar Garba (born 1990), Nigerien footballer
Issoufou Dayo (born  1991), Burkina Faso footballer
Issoufou Habou (born 1945), Nigerien light-middleweight boxer
Issoufou Saidou-Djermakoye (1920– 2000), Nigerien politician
Issoufou Sidibé, Nigerien labour leader and politician
Ousmane Issoufou Oubandawaki (born 1948), Nigerien politician

Surname 
Abdoul Razak Issoufou (born 1994), Nigerien taekwondo practitioner 
Alhassane Issoufou (born 1981), Nigerien footballer
Aissata Issoufou Mahamadou, Nigerien chemist,  chemical engineer, mining specialist, healthcare advocate and First Lady of Niger
Boubacar Idrissa Issoufou (born 197), Nigerien footballer
Lalla Malika Issoufou (born 1975), Nigerien medical doctor, patron of many charities and First Lady of Niger
Mahamadou Issoufou (born 1952), Nigerien politician, President of Niger

Surnames
Given names